Paul (Paulo) Puhiula Kanoa (June 10, 1832 – March 18, 1895) was a noble and politician in the Kingdom of Hawaii from the island of Kauai.

Life

Paul Puhiula Kanoa was born June 10, 1832, in Honolulu.
His hānai father, usually known as Paul Kanoa served as Royal Governor of Kauai, from 1847 to 1877, and died in 1885.
Since the two are often confused, the father is sometimes called "Sr." and the son "Jr."

On December 18, 1875, Kanoa became a land appraiser for the island of  Kauai. On January 12, 1881, he was appointed as Royal Governor of Kauai.King Kalākaua appointed him to the House of Nobles in the legislature of the Hawaiian Kingdom from 1882.
He was appointed minister of finance on June 30, 1886.
He was a founding member of a civic club called Hale Nauā in September 1886 which combined aspects of Freemasonry and ancient Hawaiian practices.
This cabinet was widely seen as under the influence of Claus Spreckels. The other members, under Walter M. Gibson had no other political experience in Hawaii. He kept his post in a cabinet reshuffle in October 1886, but resigned on July 1, 1887, after the 1887 Constitution of the Kingdom of Hawaii (known as the Bayonet Constitution) forced another change in government. After the House of Nobles became elected, he won the seat in 1890 and 1892.

He married Kaleipua on December 15, 1856, and died March 18, 1895, in his sleep.
The site of the family estate is now the Niumalu Beach Park. The area was also the residence of William Charles Achi Jr. and his family. The Territory of Hawaii set up the offices of Kauai County on the hill above the beach, and the site later became Kauai High School.

References

Hawaiian Kingdom politicians
Governors of Kauai
Members of the Hawaiian Kingdom House of Nobles
Members of the Hawaiian Kingdom Privy Council
Hawaiian Kingdom Finance Ministers
1832 births
1895 deaths
Recipients of the Royal Order of Kalākaua
Recipients of the Royal Order of Kapiolani
Hawaiian adoptees (hānai)
Burials at Kawaiahaʻo Church